Graham Simpson (born 27 July 1946) is an English businessman and the former chairman of English football club Watford.

Simpson joined the Watford board in November 1999. He became Executive Chairman of Watford and Watford Leisure plc in September 2002. He stated his intention to sell the club in July 2008 and resigned from his post on 1 December at an Extraordinary General Meeting.

Simpson worked as a television actor in the 1970s. He founded travel company Simply Travel. He sold the company in 1999 and later founded Simpson Travel.

References

External links

1946 births
Living people
English male television actors
English football chairmen and investors
Watford F.C. directors
English businesspeople